Deep Run is a tributary of Springers Brook in Burlington County, New Jersey in the United States. It is elevated at 33 ft (10m)

See also
List of rivers of New Jersey

References

Rivers of New Jersey
Rivers of Burlington County, New Jersey